Papyrus 123 (in the Gregory-Aland numbering), designated by 𝔓123, is an early copy of the New Testament in Greek. It is a papyrus manuscript of the First Epistle to the Corinthians.

Description 
To the present day survived only pieces from one leaf. The surviving texts of 1 Corinthians are verses 14:31-34; 15:3-6, they are in a fragmentary condition. The manuscript paleographically has been assigned to the 4th century (INTF).

 Text
Recto
 μα]ν̣θανωσιν κ[αι παντες
 παρ]α̣κ̣α̣λ̣ω̣ντ̣[αι και] π̣να προ̣φητων̣ [προφηταις
 υ]π̣ο̣τασσεται̣ ο̣υ γαρ εστι[ν α]κ̣ατασ[ιας ο θς
 αλλ ειρ]η̣νες οω εν πασαις τα[ις] εκκ̣[λησιας
 των αγι]ω̣ν̣ α̣ι̣ γ̣υναικες εν [ταις εκκλησιαις
 σιγατωσαν ου γα]ρ̣ επιτρεπ̣[εται αυταις λαλειν
 ]...[
Verso
 υ]μ̣ιν εν π̣ρωτοι̣[ς ο και παρελαβον οτι
 χς απεθα]ν̣εν υπερ των α̣[μαρτιων ημων κατα
 τας γραφ]α̣ς και ο̣[τ]ι̣ ε̣τ̣α̣φη και̣ [οτι] εγηγε̣ρτα̣[ι τη
 ημερα τη τριτ]η̣ κα̣[τα] τ̣ας̣ γραφας κ̣αι οτι ωφ[θη κηφα
 ειτα τοις δωδεκα επειτα] ω̣φθη επανω̣ πε̣ν̣[τ]α̣
 κοσιοις αδελφοις εφαπαξ ε]ξ̣ ων οι πλ̣[ειονες
 μενουσιν εως αρτι τινες δε εκο]ι̣μ[ηθησαν

The Greek text of this codex probably is a representative of the Alexandrian text-type. It was published by J. David Thomas in 2008.

Location 
The manuscript currently is housed at the Papyrology Rooms of the Sackler Library at Oxford with the shelf number P. Oxy. 4844.

See also 
 1 Corinthians 14, 15
 List of New Testament papyri
 Oxyrhynchus Papyri
 Biblical manuscript

References

Further reading 

 N. Gonis, D. Colomo, The Oxyrhynchus Papyri LXXII (London: 2008), pp. 1–3.

External links

Images 
 P. Oxy. LXIV 4844 from Papyrology at Oxford's "POxy: Oxyrhynchus Online".

Official registration 
 "Continuation of the Manuscript List" Institute for New Testament Textual Research, University of Münster. Retrieved September 8, 2009

New Testament papyri
4th-century biblical manuscripts
First Epistle to the Corinthians papyri